Adam Smith Center is a neoliberal think-tank based in Poland. It was founded in 1989.

References

External links
 Home page

1989 establishments in Poland
Think tanks established in 1989
Think tanks based in Poland
Political and economic think tanks based in Europe
Organisations based in Warsaw